Nick Seither (born March 2, 1993) is an American football defensive lineman who is currently a free agent. He previously played for the Albany Empire of the Arena Football League (AFL). He played college football at Georgetown College in Georgetown, Kentucky and attended Father Stephen T. Badin High School in Hamilton, Ohio.

Early life
Seither attended Father Stephen T. Badin High School. As a junior, Seither was named Second Team All-Division V in Ohio. Seither was again named Second Team All-Division V as a senior.

College career
Seither played for the Georgetown Tigers from 2011 to 2014. He was the team's starter his final three years and helped the Tigers to 37 wins. He played in 35 games during his career including 32 starts at defensive end. As a senior in 2014, Seither was named a First Team All-American by the American Football Coaches Association.

Statistics
Source:

Professional career

Seither invited to the Arizona Cardinals mini-camp in April, 2015 as an undrafted free agent, but he failed to make the team.

On June 7, 2016, Seither was assigned to the Cleveland Gladiators. On January 5, 2017, Seither had his rookie option exercised by the Gladiators. He earned Second Team All-Arena honors in 2017.

Seither was selected by the Beijing Lions in the third round of the 2017 CAFL Draft.

On March 20, 2018, Seither was assigned to the Albany Empire.

In November 2018, Seither signed with the Birmingham Iron of the AAF.

On March 6, 2019, Seither was assigned to the Columbus Destroyers.

References

External links
Georgetown Tigers profile

Living people
1993 births
Players of American football from Ohio
Sportspeople from Hamilton, Ohio
American football defensive linemen
Georgetown Tigers football players
Cleveland Gladiators players
Beijing Lions players
Albany Empire (AFL) players
Birmingham Iron players
Columbus Destroyers players